Country music awards may refer to:

American Music Awards
 American Music Award (1973–present), created by Dick Clark
 American Music Award for Favorite Country Album
 American Music Award for Favorite Country Band/Duo/Group
 American Music Award for Favorite Country Female Artist
 American Music Award for Favorite Country Male Artist
 American Music Award for Favorite Country New Artist, discontinued after 2003
 American Music Award for Favorite Country Single, discontinued after 1995

Grammy Awards
 Grammy Award (1959–present)
 Grammy Award for Best Bluegrass Album
 Grammy Award for Best Country & Western Recording
 Grammy Award for Best Country Album
 Grammy Award for Best Country Collaboration with Vocals
 Grammy Award for Best Country Instrumental Performance
 Grammy Award for Best Country Performance by a Duo or Group with Vocal, awarded from 1970 to 2011
 Grammy Award for Best Country Song
 Grammy Award for Best Female Country Vocal Performance
 Grammy Award for Best Male Country Vocal Performance, awarded between 1965 and 2011
 Grammy Award for Best New Country & Western Artist, presented in 1965 and 1966
 Grammy Award for Best Southern, Country or Bluegrass Gospel Album

Canadian awards
 Canadian Country Music Awards (1982–present)
 Juno Award (1970–present)
 Juno Award for Country Recording of the Year

Other
 Academy of Country Music Awards (1965–present)
 American Country Awards (2010–2013), voted by fans online
 American Country Countdown Awards (2014–present), based on album sales, touring data, and radio airplay
 CMT Music Awards by Country Music Television (2002–present)
 Country Music Association Awards (1967–present)
 Country Music Awards of Australia (1973–present)